Edwin Henry Lemare (9 September 1865 – 24 September 1934) was an English organist and composer who lived the latter part of his life in the United States. He was one of the most highly regarded and highly paid organists of his generation, as well as the greatest performer and one of the most important composers of the late Romantic English-American Organ School.

Biography

Edwin H. Lemare was born in Ventnor, on the Isle of Wight on 9 September 1865. His birth year is sometimes erroneously stated as 1866, including in Lemare's own autobiography Organs I Have Met. He received his early musical training as a chorister and organist under his father (a music seller, also called Edwin Lemare) at Holy Trinity Church. He then spent three years at the Royal Academy of Music from 1876 on a Goss Scholarship, where he studied under Sir George Alexander Macfarren, Walter Cecil Macfarren, Dr Charles Steggall and Dr Edmund Hart Turpin. He obtained the F.C.O. (Fellow of the College of Organists, later to become the Royal College of Organists) in 1886. He became an organ professor and examiner for the Associated Board of the Royal Schools of Music in 1892.

He gained fame by playing two recitals a day, over a hundred in total, on the one-manual Brindley & Foster organ in the Inventions Exhibition in 1884. He gave bi-weekly recitals at the Park Hall, Cardiff, from 1886; this was followed by further appointments around Great Britain.

While organist at Sheffield Parish Church, he eloped with Marian Broomhead Colton-Fox because her father, a well-known lawyer, did not approve of him.

After eight years of marriage, they were divorced and Lemare married Elsie Francis Reith. They were divorced in 1909.

Lemare left England for the United States where he married Charlotte Bauersmith, twenty years his junior, shortly after arriving in New York. She was herself an organist and sometimes substituted for him.

After apparently treating church services in London as concerts, he left for a hundred-recital tour of the United States and Canada from 1900/01, and stayed in North America for most of the remainder of his life. He also toured Europe, Australia, and New Zealand, where he helped to design the organs for Auckland Town Hall and Melbourne Town Hall. He died in Hollywood, California. He is interred in the Hall of Righteousness Crypt No. 6691 at Forest Lawn Memorial Park, Glendale, California.

Organist posts held

St. Mary's, Brookfield, Highgate
St. John's, Finsbury Park, 1882
Park Hall, Cardiff
Sheffield Parish Church, 1886
Albert Hall, Sheffield, 1886
Holy Trinity, Sloane Street, London, 1892–1895
St. Margaret's, Westminster, London, 1897–1902
Carnegie Institute, Pittsburgh, 1902–1905
Panama–Pacific International Exposition, San Francisco, 1915
City Organist, San Francisco, 1917–1920
Municipal Organist, Kotzschmar Memorial Organ, Portland, Maine, 1921–1923
Civic Organist, Chattanooga, Tennessee, 1924–192

Abilities as organist and composer
As a player, he had a very large repertoire and was in constant demand; he was the most highly paid organist of his day, and earned previously unheard-of sums when he went to America. He performed to as many as 10,000 people, and travelled the Atlantic so often that crew members of the ocean liners knew him by name. Some evidence of his excellent playing survives to this day: he made 24 player rolls for the Aeolian Company and 96 for Welte in Freiburg, which have been played again and recorded. He was also a very capable improviser; he recorded and transcribed some of his improvisations for publication. Percy Fletcher wrote his virtuosic Festival Toccata for Lemare in 1915.

Of his many compositions for the organ, many are light music designed to show off the tone and capabilities of the huge organs of his day, and have fallen out of favour (though Christopher Herrick has recorded some of Lemare's music in his Organ Fireworks series). Unusually, his qualities as a composer are generally thought to have declined rather than improved with age; his first two organ symphonies are considered to rival those of his French contemporaries in quality.

Moonlight and Roses

The Andantino in D-flat, known as Moonlight and Roses, Op. 83, No. 2 (1888), is one of Lemare's few well-known original compositions. It became so popular that he was asked to play it in nearly all his concerts. It sold tens of thousands of copies, though he did not initially make any money out of it; when it was published in 1892 by Robert Cocks in London, he received a flat fee of three guineas. Lemare did not call it Moonlight and Roses nor did he attach any words to the tune; it was American songwriters Ben Black and Charles N. Daniels (under the pseudonym Neil Moret) who added these words to the melody, without permission, in 1921:

The piece became extremely popular and sold over one million copies. Lemare threatened legal action in 1925, resulting in his obtaining a share of the royalties; he finally profited from his popular tune.

The piece uses the technique known as thumbing down; the left hand plays an accompaniment on the choir manual, while the fingers of the right hand play the tune on the solo manual, and the thumb of the right hand simultaneously plays the tune on the great manual, in parallel sixths. The player is thus playing on three manuals at once.

"Moonlight and Roses" was sung by Roy Rogers in the 1943 film Song of Texas.

The song also became a U.S. Pop (#51) and Easy Listening (#5) hit for Vic Dana in 1965. It was entitled, "Moonlight and Roses (Bring Memories of You)."

Compositions for organ

Published as The Organ Music of Edwin H. Lemare, edited by Wayne Leupold (Wayne Leupold Editions/E. C. Schirmer). Series I (Original Compositions): Volume I, II, III and IV; Series II (Transcriptions). He also composed church music and an orchestral symphony.

Original

Allegretto in B minor 
Andante Cantabile in F (Op. 37)
Andantino in D-flat (also known as Moonlight & Roses)
Arcadian Idyll (Op. 52) (1: Serenade; 2: Musette; 3: Solitude)
Barcarolle in A-flat
Bell Scherzo (Op. 89)
Bénédiction Nuptiale (Op. 85)
Berceuse in D
Cantique d'Amour (Op. 47)
Caprice Orientale (Op. 46)
Chanson d'Été in B-flat
Chant de Boneur (Op. 62)
Chant sans paroles in D
Cloches Sonores (Basso Ostinato) – symphonic sketch (Op. 63)
Communion Peace (Op. 68)
Concert Fantasia in F
Concert Fantasy On the tune 'Hanover'
Concertstück No 1 – In the form of a Polonaise (Op. 80)
Concertstück No 2 – In form of a Tarantella (Op. 90)
Contemplation in D minor (Op. 42)
Elegy in G
Evening Pastorale The Curfew (Op. 128)
Fantaisie Fugue in G minor (Op. 48)
Fantasie Dorienne in the form of variations (Op. 101)
Gavotte Moderne in A-flat

Gavotte à la cour (Op. 84)
Idyll in E-flat
Impromptu in A
Intermezzo : Moonlight (Op. 83/2)
Intermezzo in B-flat (Op. 39)
Irish Air from County Derry (arr. by)
Madrigal in D-flat
Marche Heroïque (Op. 74)
Marche Solennelle in E-flat
Meditation in D-flat (Op. 38)
Minuet Nuptiale (Op. 103)
Nocturne in B minor (Op. 41)
Pastorale No 2 in C
Pastorale Poem (Op. 54)
Pastorale in E
Rêverie in E-flat (Op. 20)
Rhapsody in C minor (Op. 43)
Romance in D-flat
Romance in D-flat (No 2) (Op. 112)
Salut d'Amour (Op. 127)
Scherzo
Second Andantino in D-flat
Sonata No 1 in F (Op. 95) (1: Maestoso; 2: Largo; 3: Scherzo; 4: Intermezzo; 5: Finale)
 Soutenir (A Study on One Note) 
Spring Song – From the South (Op. 56)
Summer Sketches (1: Dawn; 2: The Bee; 3: The Cuckoo; 4: Twilight; 5: Evening) (Op. 73)
Sunshine (Op. 83/1)
Symphony No 1 in G minor (1: Allegro Moderato; 2: Adagio Cantabile; 3: Scherzo; 4: Finale) (Op. 35)
Symphony No 2 in D minor (1: Maestoso con fuoco; 2: Adagio patetico; 3: Scherzo; 4: Allegro giusto) (Op. 50)
Tears and Smiles (1: Tears; 2: Smiles) (Op. 133)
Toccata di concerto
Twilight Sketches (Op. 138) (1: Sundown; 2: The Glow-Worm; 3: The Fire Fly; 4: Dusk)

Transcriptions

Lemare was a prolific transcriber of orchestral music for the organ for his own performance in concerts. While there was likely an element of pure showmanship to these transcriptions – which allowed Lemare to display his uncanny skill as a transcriber of major symphonic works, as well as his phenomenal technique – Lemare sincerely believed he was also performing a service in letting concert audiences in mid-sized American towns hear important orchestral works from Europe that would otherwise go unknown in locales with no resident symphony orchestra. Many of his transcriptions are still performed today, especially those he did of the works of Richard Wagner.

Johannes Brahms

Akademische Festouvertüre (Op. 80)
Ungarischer Tanz No. 5

Edward Elgar

Gavotte in A
Idylle (Op. 4/1)
Pomp and Circumstance March No. 1 (Op. 39)
Salut d'Amour (Op. 12)
Sursum Corda (Élévation) (Op. 11)
Triumphal March from Caractacus (Op. 35)

Camille Saint-Saëns

Danse macabre (Op. 40)

Richard Wagner

"Entrance of the Gods into Valhalla" from Das Rheingold
Overture to Der fliegende Holländer
Overture to Die Meistersinger von Nürnberg
Overture to Rienzi
Overture to Tannhäuser
"Ride of the Valkyries" from Die Walküre
"Wotan's Farewell and Magic Fire Music" from Die Walküre
Prelude to act 3 and "Bridal Music" from Lohengrin

Further reading

Edwin H. Lemare: Organs I have Met: the Autobiography of Edwin H. Lemare, 1866–1934, together with Reminiscences by his Wife and Friends (Los Angeles: Schoolcraft, 1956)
Nelson Barden: "Edwin H. Lemare", in The American Organist
Part 1: Becoming the Best (January 1986, Vol. 20, No. 1)
Part 2: Pittsburgh and Australia (March 1986, Vol. 20, No. 3)
Part 3: The Midlands, Liverpool, Freiburg (June 1986, Vol. 20, No. 6)
Part 4: San Francisco, Portland, Chattanooga, Hollywood (August 1986, Vol. 20, No. 8)

Notes

References

External links

Edwin H. Lemare: The most detailed biography of Lemare on the web by Nelson Barden. English and French version.
Recordings: "In 1913, at the height of his career, Lemare recorded 96 organ rolls for Welte & Söhne in Freiburg, Germany. These selections were re-performed in 1973 on the Welte-Tripp organ in the Church of the Covenant, Boston."
Welte Restored. Welte Organ at Sir David Salomons house, Royal Academy of Music, 2011
Letter written by Lemare in which he refers to his wife as his 'other eleven sixteenths'
Sheet Music by Edwin Lemare
Edwin H. Lemare at www.edwinlemare.com – website representing a biographical book
The Citizens' Committee To Preserve The San Francisco Municipal Pipe Organ at SFExpositionOrgan.org - website and video for The Citizen's Committee to Preserve The San Francisco Exposition Organ

1866 births
1934 deaths
Alumni of the Royal Academy of Music
Composers for pipe organ
English classical organists
British male organists
English classical composers
Organ improvisers
People from Ventnor
English Romantic composers
English emigrants to the United States
English male classical composers
20th-century British male musicians
19th-century British male musicians
Male classical organists